Bertoua is the capital of the Eastern Region of Cameroon and of the Lom-et-Djerem Department. It has a population of 88,462 (at the 2005 Census), and is the traditional home of the Gbaya people. It is home to an airport and Mission Cameroon (in Polish: Misja Kamerun) of Polish Dominican Order.

In 2014, the hospital in Bertoua became known for its work serving the medical needs of refugees from the Central African Republic crossing into Cameroon at border towns such as Gbiti.

See also
Communes of Cameroon

References

External links
Misja Kamerun

Populated places in East Region (Cameroon)
Provincial capitals in Cameroon
Communes of Cameroon